Nili is an Israeli settlement in the West Bank. Located 3.8 kilometres east of the Green line and a few hundred metres from the Palestinian village of Deir Qaddis, it is organised as a community settlement and falls under the jurisdiction of Mateh Binyamin Regional Council.

The international community considers Israeli settlements in the West Bank illegal under international law, but the Israeli government disputes this.

Etymology
The settlement was named after the Jewish espionage network NILI, an acronym of a phrase  (I Samuel 15:29; transliteration: Netzakh Yisrael Lo Yishaker, literal translation: "The Eternal One of Israel does not lie"), which assisted the United Kingdom in its fight against the Ottoman Empire in the Land of Israel during World War I.

History
The settlement was established in 1981. The land it is built on was defined as state land, but residents of the village of Deir Qaddis claim the land was theirs and that they have documents to prove it. In December 2010, a request they filed to halt construction to expand the settlement of Nili was denied by the Supreme Court of Israel. Adopting a nonviolent tactic, residents of Deir Qaddis have organized daily marches to Nili. In June 2011, after a group of young Palestinians clashed with Israeli soldiers, army jeeps were stationed in the area to prevent the Palestinian villagers from entering the settlement.

References

External links

Israeli settlements in the West Bank
Populated places established in 1981
Mateh Binyamin Regional Council
1981 establishments in the Israeli Military Governorate
Community settlements